Longland, also known as the Margaret Mead Farmstead, is a historic home located near Holicong, in Buckingham Township, Bucks County, Pennsylvania. The house was built in 1845, and is a large 2 3/4-story, five bay by two bay, stuccoed stone dwelling.  It has Greek Revival design details and features an ornate entranceway with rectangular transom and sidelights. Also on the property is a three-story, stone bank barn dated to 1844. It has an attached one-story stone ell. Other contributing buildings are a two-story, wood-frame wagon house and woodshed / garage that abuts the house. It was a childhood home of American anthropologist Margaret Mead (1901-1978).  Her family purchased the property in 1912 and sold it in 1926.

It was added to the National Register of Historic Places in 1999.

References

Houses on the National Register of Historic Places in Pennsylvania
Greek Revival houses in Pennsylvania
Houses completed in 1845
Houses in Bucks County, Pennsylvania
National Register of Historic Places in Bucks County, Pennsylvania